Mark Hardy may refer to:
Mark A. Hardy, Columbia University surgeon
Mark Hardy (actor), portrayed the Cyber Lieutenant in Doctor Who during the 1980s
Mark Hardy (baseball) (born 1988), Canadian baseball player
Mark Hardy (ice hockey) (born 1959), Swiss-born Canadian hockey player